Jesper Brodin (born November 9, 1968) is a Swedish business leader and the chief executive officer (CEO) of Ingka Group. During his career at IKEA, Brodin has held a number of different roles including assistant to Ingvar Kamprad, Business Area Manager Kitchen and Dining, as well as managing director for Range & Supply, Inter IKEA Group.

Early life and education 
Born in 1968 in Gothenburg, Sweden, Brodin graduated with a M.Sc. in Industrial Engineering from Chalmers University of Technology in 1994.

Career 
Brodin has held several positions within Ingka Group. In 1995, Brodin joined IKEA as the company's Purchase Manager in Pakistan. After Pakistan, he became the Range & Supply Manager in Southeast Asia in 1997. In 1999, Brodin assumed the role of assistant to Ingvar Kamprad and Anders Dahlvig, CEO of IKEA Group at the time. In 2008, Brodin moved to China to become Regional Purchase Manager. In 2011 he moved back to Sweden to serve as IKEA Supply Chain Manager at IKEA of Sweden, before becoming CEO of IKEA Range & Supply in 2013. Brodin succeeded Peter Agnefjäll as CEO of Ingka Group in September 2017.

Climate advocacy 
In 2019, Brodin joined The B Team, a nonprofit organization advocating ecological sustainability and humanitarianism in global business practices. He is also the chair of World Economic Forum Alliance of CEO Climate Leaders, a committee of corporate administrators who employ environmentally conscious business strategies.

Personal life 
Brodin lives in Helsingborg, Sweden. He is married with three children and fills his spare time with sailing and music.

References

Swedish business executives
Swedish businesspeople
Chalmers University of Technology alumni
IKEA
1968 births
Living people